The 1946 Argentine Primera División was the 55th season of top-flight football in Argentina. The season began on April 21 and ended on December 8. Tigre returned to Primera while Ferro Carril Oeste was relegated.

San Lorenzo won its 6th league title.

League standings

References

Argentine Primera División seasons
Argentine Primera Division
Primera Division